The Addams Family 2 is a 2021 computer-animated supernatural black comedy road film directed by Greg Tiernan and Conrad Vernon, co-directed by Laura Brousseau and Kevin Pavlovic, written by Dan Hernandez, Benji Samit, Ben Queen, and Susanna Fogel with a story by Hernandez and Samit, and based on the characters created by Charles Addams. It is the sequel to the 2019 film The Addams Family and stars the voices of Oscar Isaac, Charlize Theron, Chloë Grace Moretz, Nick Kroll, Javon Walton, Wallace Shawn, Snoop Dogg, Bette Midler, and Bill Hader. It tells the story of the Addams family as they go on a road trip.

The film was theatrically released in the United States by United Artists Releasing on October 1, 2021, followed by an international release by Universal Pictures on October 8. It also became available for online rental on the same day in the United States and Canada. The film was not as successful as its predecessor and received generally negative reviews from critics, who criticized the humor and story.

Plot

At a science fair, Wednesday Addams is set to present her experiment, where she uses her pet squid Socrates' DNA on Uncle Fester to show how humans can be improved (with the side effect of gradually transmutating Fester). However, she is dismayed when she sees her family arrive. Nonetheless, her work gets noticed by scientist Cyrus Strange. Back at the Addams' home, Gomez worries that the children are drifting apart from him and Morticia, so he decides to take them on a family vacation. Before the family, Fester, Thing and Lurch head on a road trip across the United States, Gomez and Morticia are approached by a lawyer named Mr. Mustela, who claims that Wednesday was switched at birth and may not actually be an Addams, but they ignore him. On the road, the Addams family is pursued by Mustela and his employer's henchman Pongo.

The family is initially set on going to Salem, Massachusetts, but Fester, who is slowly mutating due to the experiment, ends up making a detour to Niagara Falls. The family later stops in Sleepy Hollow, New York. Gomez and Morticia bring up Mustela and his claims about Wednesday, so Fester mentions a story when he visited Wednesday the day she was born and juggled babies in the delivery room. This only worsens Gomez and Morticia's fears that Wednesday may not be their biological child, which Wednesday overhears.

Gomez brings everyone to Miami to get in touch with Cousin Itt, in hopes he can help with their current dilemma. Itt joins them on the trip as they pass through San Antonio and leaves the family early at the Grand Canyon. Meanwhile, Wednesday traps Mustela in a rope trap on her own and learns he is working for Cyrus before "letting him go". Cyrus suggests to Wednesday that he is her true father and invites her to his home in Sausalito, California. Wednesday runs a DNA test using Gomez's hair, which seemingly proves that she is not his daughter. Wednesday leaves the family while they sleep, but Lurch catches up with her. The rest of the Addams learn where she is heading and follow suit.

At his home, Cyrus shows Wednesday a formula he developed to make human–animal hybrids, similar to Wednesday's experiment. When the rest of the Addams family shows up, Wednesday is persuaded to stay with Cyrus. After Pugsley finds out that Cyrus' daughter Ophelia is a pig, Cyrus reveals he is using Wednesday, as her formula was better than his. He captures the family to test on them, but Wednesday refuses to do so. Cyrus tries to get Pongo to go after her, but it is revealed Lurch and Pongo knew each other before while in a mental asylum, and they decide to free the Addams. Cyrus comes into contact with his formula during the scuffle and turns into a hybrid monster. The now-completely insane doctor tries to kill the family, but is stopped by Fester, who has fully mutated into a squid monster. After the two fight, Cyrus falls off a cliff to his death. Fester is turned back to normal by Wednesday, using a necklace of her family's blood that Morticia gave her earlier.

Wednesday reunites with her family and they return home along with Pongo and Ophelia, the latter of whom has become fully human following contact with Wednesday's formula and falls in love with Pugsley. While Wednesday knew that Cyrus faked his DNA test results, Gomez reveals to Wednesday that he wears a toupée after losing his original hair in a napalm accident. He promises the family that next time, he will take them on a trip across the world.

Voice cast

 Oscar Isaac as Gomez Addams, Morticia's husband and Wednesday's and Pugsley's father.  
 Charlize Theron as Morticia Addams (née Frump), Gomez's wife and Wednesday's and Pugsley's mother.  
 Chloë Grace Moretz as Wednesday Addams, Gomez and Morticia's daughter, Pugsley's older sister, and a mad science child prodigy.  
 Nick Kroll as Uncle Fester, Gomez's brother who Wednesday used in an experiment involving Socrates' DNA.
 Javon Walton as Pugsley Addams, Gomez and Morticia's son and Wednesday's younger brother. He was voiced by Finn Wolfhard in the previous film.
 Bette Midler as Grandmama Addams, Gomez and Fester's mother.
 Conrad Vernon as
 Lurch, the Addams Family's butler.
 Dominic Lewis provides Lurch's singing voice for a rendition of Gloria Gaynor's "I Will Survive"
 The spirit who haunts the Addams' house
 Snoop Dogg as Cousin Itt, Gomez and Fester's hairy cousin.
 Bill Hader as Cyrus Strange, a scientist who claims that he is Wednesday's biological father.
 Wallace Shawn as Mr. Mustela, Cyrus' lawyer who is pursuing the Addams family.
 Brian Sommer as Big Bad Ronny, a tough biker who helps Wednesday and Lurch get to Sausalito, California.
 Griffin Burns as a dorky boy at a science fair.
 Courtenay Taylor as Girl in Water
 Ted Evans as Pongo, Cyrus and Mr. Mustela's hulking henchman who mostly makes sounds and is old friends with Lurch.
 Cherami Leigh as Ophelia, Cyrus' daughter whom he created from a pig.
 Mary Faber as:
 Miss Lurleen, the bartender of a biker bar that Big Bad Ronnie's biker gang visited.
 Texas Lady
 Pageant Lady
 A PA announcer for the Cyrus Strange Foundation
 Ava Luna Floisand as Corney Girl
 Kyla Pratt as:
 Book Girl
 A kid at a science fair who worked on a volcano project
 Festival Kid #1
 Peggy, a girl at a pageant in San Antonio who gets frightened when Wednesday does her possessed voice towards her.
  Charlet Chung as:
 Madison, a girl who is being proposed to.
 Festival Kid #2
 Girl on Beach
 A dorky girl at a science fair
 Kyle Chapple as:
 A proposing guy whose marriage proposal keeps getting disrupted by the Addams Family's shenanigans.
 Jerk on Beach
 Truck Driver
 Peter James King III as Merch Guy
 Bryson Queinn as Festival Kid #3

Production
On October 15, 2019, following the 2019 film's successful opening weekend, it was announced that a sequel to the film was scheduled to be theatrically released on October 22, 2021, and that Greg Tiernan and Conrad Vernon would return to direct the film. Cinesite Studios was again a production partner on the film and provided CG animation and digital visual effects for the sequel. 2D animation from the credits was provided by Creative Capers Entertainment.

Most of the original actors returned, while in October 2020, Bill Hader and Javon Walton joined the cast, with Hader as a new character named Cyrus and Walton replacing Finn Wolfhard as the voice of Pugsley Addams. In July 2021, Wallace Shawn was revealed to have voiced a new character.

Music
In July 2021, Mychael Danna and Jeff Danna were announced to have composed the score for The Addams Family 2, as with the first film. In September 2021, Maluma, Megan Thee Stallion, and Rock Mafia created a new song called "Crazy Family", while "My Family" gets a remix by Yoshi Flower. Dominic Lewis, composer of Peter Rabbit, did a cover of "I Will Survive" for Lurch at the bar. Similar to the previous film's ending, an updated version of Vic Mizzy's theme from the original TV series plays in the ending, this time performed by Christina Aguilera, who provided the previous film's opening song.

Release
The Addams Family 2 was theatrically released in the United States by United Artists Releasing and internationally by Universal Pictures on October 1, 2021. The film also became available for online rental on the same day.

It was previously scheduled for release on October 22 and October 8. On January 21, 2021, it was moved up to October 1, 2021, allowing the James Bond film No Time to Die (another MGM title) to take over the October 8 slot. In June 2021, United Artists Releasing announced they did not plan on rescheduling The Addams Family 2, in the wake of Hotel Transylvania: Transformania moving to the same weekend (which later moved to January 14, 2022). In August 2021, the film shifted its release for online rental to the same day as its theatrical bow in the United States and Canada, due to the COVID-19 pandemic.

Home media
The film was released on Blu-ray and DVD on January 18, 2022 by Universal Pictures Home Entertainment.

Reception

Box office
The Addams Family 2 grossed $56.5million in the United States and Canada, and $63.5million in other territories, for a worldwide total of $120million.

In the United States and Canada, The Addams Family 2 was released alongside Venom: Let There Be Carnage and The Many Saints of Newark, and was projected to gross $15–17 million from 4,207 theaters in its opening weekend. The film made $5.5 million on its first day, including $550,000 from Thursday night previews. It went on to debut to $17.3 million, finishing second, behind Let There Be Carnage. The film dropped 42% in its second weekend to $10 million, finishing third. It finished in fourth place during its third weekend at the box office, declining 30% to $7.1 million.

Critical response
On review aggregation website Rotten Tomatoes, the film holds an approval rating of 28% based on 112 reviews, with an average rating of 4.60/10. The website's critical consensus reads, "Altogether ooky, and not in a good way." Metacritic assigned the film a weighted average score of 37 out of 100, based on 23 critics, indicating "generally unfavorable reviews." Audiences polled by CinemaScore gave the film an average grade of "B" on an A+ to F scale, while those at PostTrak gave it an 87% positive score, with 73% saying they would definitely recommend it.

Owen Gleiberman of Variety wrote about the film "It's in the nature of most animated sequels to struggle to recapture the full charm of the original hit. But in the case of "The Addams Family 2," Tiernan and Vernon have used the sequel as an opportunity for an upgrade. The script is by an entirely new team, and in some ineffable bats-in-the-belfry way the jokes now land with a more inspired and spontaneous creepy kookiness." Savannah Lee of Parent Previews criticized the film, writing "I didn't see the 2019 version of The Addams Family because it didn't look appealing and my son was too young to clamor for it. I read a quick plot synopsis to get myself caught up, but I probably didn't need to. This movie has little, if anything, to do with the previous installment, so you can just jump right in if you so choose." Nell Minow  of RogerEbert.com gave a 3 out of 4 stars and wrote, "An intrusive product placement billboard will trigger the irritation viewers may have with the odd cross-promotion in television commercials on behalf of both this movie and an insurance company. Of more concern, parents may get some tough questions due to the paternity issues raised by the film, including DNA tests. The issues of who a child 'belongs' to and what biology has to do with identity will be a concern for some families."

Sandie Angulo Chen of Common Sense Media gave the film 3 stars out of 5 and wrote "Silly sequel focuses on family love; peril, some racy jokes." Meagan Navarro of Bloody Disgusting gave 2 bones out of 5 and wrote "The Addams Family 2 might change its scenery, but it doesn't deviate from its approach. It's still a ridiculous, straightforward animated update to an enduring property. Grown-ups may disown this take on The Addams Family, but it was never meant for adults anyway. This focuses solely on tickling the funny bone of the youngest of audiences. In other words, it's not a great movie, but it likely succeeds in its goal as a manic comedy bit for children. That it steps further away from a grim aesthetic means it's a far more anemic gateway into the genre than before." Molly Freeman of Screen Rant called the film "[...] a shallow continuation that spends too much time on unconnected hijinks resulting in an uneven sequel with much less heart."

Accolades

Mychael and Jeff Danna won Best Original Score in an Animated Film at the 12th Hollywood Music in Media Awards. At the 49th Annie Awards, storyboard artist Steven Garcia received a nomination for Best Storyboarding – Feature. Theron's performance was nominated for Favorite Voice from an Animated Movie at the 2022 Kids' Choice Awards. At the 47th Saturn Awards, the film received a nomination for Best Animated Film.

See also
 The Addams Family (1973 TV series) - A short-lived TV series detailing the road trip of the Addams Family.
 The Addams Family (1992 TV series) - 30 years later for 2022, since 1992

References

External links

2020s English-language films
2021 computer-animated films
2021 fantasy films
2021 films
3D animated films
American 3D films
American adventure comedy films
American black comedy films
American children's animated comedy films
American children's animated fantasy films
American comedy road movies
American comedy horror films
American computer-animated films
American fantasy comedy films
American sequel films
Animated films about families
Animated films set in California
Animated films set in New York (state)
Bron Studios films
Canadian animated feature films
Canadian adventure comedy films
Canadian black comedy films
Canadian comedy road movies
Canadian comedy horror films
Canadian computer-animated films
Canadian fantasy comedy films
Canadian sequel films
Films directed by Conrad Vernon
Films directed by Greg Tiernan
Films impacted by the COVID-19 pandemic
Films produced by Conrad Vernon
Films produced by Gail Berman
Films scored by Jeff Danna
Films scored by Mychael Danna
Films set in Arizona
Films set in Miami
Films set in San Antonio
Films with screenplays by Conrad Vernon
Films about vacationing
Films about witchcraft
Grand Canyon in fiction
Metro-Goldwyn-Mayer animated films
Metro-Goldwyn-Mayer films
Niagara Falls in fiction
The Addams Family films
Universal Pictures animated films
Universal Pictures films
Mad scientist films
2020s Canadian films
2010s Canadian films
2020s American films